"Sad!" (stylized in all-caps) is a song by American rapper and singer XXXTentacion from his second studio album, ? (2018). It was released as the lead single from the album on March 2, 2018. The track was produced by John Cunningham, and written by XXXTentacion. The song is XXXTentacion's highest charting in the United States, peaking at number one on the Billboard Hot 100 following his death on June 18, 2018. The song has also amassed more than 1.8 billion streams on Spotify, being one of the most streamed songs on the platform. The song remains X's biggest and arguably most popular hit song to date.
The song discusses X's experiences with depression and romantic turmoil, as well as his personal regrets about his past.

A music video for the song was released on June 28, via his YouTube channel. On August 13, 2021, the single was certified Diamond by the RIAA in the US. The song has since come to be regarded as XXXTentacion's signature song.

Background
XXXTentacion began working with the producer for "SAD!", John Cunningham, in January 2018 after a preview of an acoustic song was uploaded to X's Instagram page showing Cunningham playing the guitar whilst X sung. On January 11, 2018, X uploaded a gaming video to his YouTube channel showing him playing the popular video game, PlayerUnknown's Battlegrounds. The intro to the video was a preview for "SAD!" and X further previewed the song a month later in a video on February 4, 2018, using it for his intro, after speculation the song was titled "SAD n Low" following a mass amount of snippets uploaded to YouTube. X went on to preview the song one more time in a YouTube video before its official release a few days later.

Release and reception
On March 1, 2018, X announced he was releasing two songs from his upcoming album ?, saying on Instagram "Dropping two songs from my album tonight at 12:00 am est, play them more times than you can count." "SAD!" was released on March 2, 2018, on Spotify, Deezer, iTunes/Apple Music and Tidal alongside "Changes".

HotNewHipHop compared "SAD!" to the singles on X's debut album, 17 due to its emo hip hop aesthetic, saying "Once again, the young Floridian is veering into emo territory — with a lo-fi synth string loop and crisp percussion, the melodic ballad showcases X's ear for melody." XXL noted how the "upbeat instrumental" varied from the lyrics that shown XXX "struggling with depression and suicide over an ex-lover." Rap-Up also pointed out the "emo-melodies" that surround the track and spoke on the theme of suicidal thoughts over an ill-fated romance. The song has also amassed more than 1.5 billion streams on Spotify, being one of the most streamed songs on the platform.

On May 10, 2018, Billboard reported that the song was removed from Spotify playlists after their newly enacted "hateful conduct policy" came into effect. Six days after the playlist removal, the song's streams dropped 17 percent per day in the United States on average. The decision to remove X's music from curated playlists was later reversed after Top Dawg Entertainment CEO Anthony Tiffith and rapper Kendrick Lamar threatened to remove their music from the service if X's music was not reinstated.

Chart performance
In the United States, "SAD!" debuted at number 17 on the Billboard Hot 100 in the week beginning March 12, 2018, becoming XXXTentacion's highest debuting and highest-charting song in the country, gaining 66 million streams in 12 days. The song later rose to number seven, making "SAD!" XXXTentacion's first top ten entry in the US.

In the United Kingdom, "SAD!" was at number 33 by the midweek,  becoming X's highest-charting song in the country next to "Jocelyn Flores", which peaked at 39, and his second top 40 entry. The song officially debuted at number 26, becoming XXXTentacion's first top 30 hit in the country. "SAD!" reached the top 10 in Sweden, Australia, and New Zealand. It also reached the top 20 in Ireland, and the top 40 in Norway.

"SAD!" broke numerous commercial performance records following XXXTentacion's death. It amassed 10.4 million streams on Spotify on June 19, 2018, breaking the single-day record for streams on the platform.
It jumped from number 52 to number one on the Billboard Hot 100 on the week beginning June 25, 2018. This made him the first act to earn a posthumous Hot 100 number-one single as a lead artist since The Notorious B.I.G. with "Mo Money Mo Problems" in 1997, and overall, the ninth artist to have topped the chart posthumously. "SAD!" official audio reached one billion YouTube views on January 14, 2021.

Music video

The music video for Onfroy's "SAD!" premiered one day after his memorial service at the BB&T Center on June 28, 2018. The video was written and "creative directed" by Onfroy himself, and directed by JMP. In the video, an older X attends the funeral of his younger self, which has his older split-dye yellow-black hair, the same hairstyle that was present in X's famous mugshot after being arrested on domestic violence charges. When X approaches the casket to look at his younger self, the younger X suddenly returns to life. The two begin fighting in the church and out in the alley. Before, during, and after the fight, a dark hooded figure speaks to X, asking various questions and advocating for a way of thinking centered on love rather than hate and for X to realize that the biggest enemy in his life has been himself. X defeats his younger self and leaves him lying on the ground in a completely white location. A piece of paper appears on the screen that reads, "People change, things change, and so did I." The video concludes with the words "LONG LIVE PRINCE X". The video has over 161 million views across YouTube as of March 2023. The audio has over 1.2 Billion views as of March 2023, making it his most popular YouTube video.

Credits and personnel
Credits adapted from Tidal.
 Jahseh Onfroy – songwriting, composition
 John Cunningham – songwriting, composition, production
 Koen Heldens – mixing
 Kevin Peterson – mastering 
 Dave Kutch – mastering

Charts

Weekly charts

Year-end charts

Certifications

References

External links

2018 songs
2018 singles
Billboard Hot 100 number-one singles
Cloud rap songs
Number-one singles in Greece
Number-one singles in Portugal
Songs about suicide
XXXTentacion songs
Songs written by XXXTentacion
Alternative R&B songs